Bob Sadowski may refer to:

 Bob Sadowski (third baseman) (1937–2017), American who played 1960–1963, later manager
 Bob Sadowski (pitcher) (born 1938), American who played 1963–1966